Ahronglong Sakinu (Pinayuanan: Sakinu Yalonglong; born 28 January 1972) is a Taiwanese indigenous Paiwan writer and forest hunter. His name means "The Last Hunter" in Lalaulan. His Chinese name is Dai Zhiqiang. He was born to the Paiwan Lalaulan clan in Taitung, Taiwan, on 28 January 1972. His father was a laborer and often abusive toward Ahronglong Sakinu and his two brothers. The abuse forced his mother out of the house, and Ahronglong Sakinu often ran away. He was trained as a police officer, and found law enforcement work in Taipei. He later became a forest ranger.

He gained recognition from his book The Sage Hunter (山豬．飛鼠．撒可努), winning the 2000 Wu Yung-fu Literature Prize (巫永福文學獎). The book, written in 1998, was adapted into a film and released in 2005. His work has been translated into English and Japanese, and also made into cartoons. In November 2005, he founded a hunter school to educate and introduce youngsters to Paiwan culture and traditional Paiwan skills.

List of works 
 The Sage Hunter (山豬．飛鼠．撒可努)
 Wind Walker, My Dad the Hunter (走風的人, 我的獵人父親)
 Grandpa's Ocean (外公的海)
 Vu Vu's Tales (Vu Vu 的故事)
 Pali's Red Eyes (巴里的紅眼睛), a Paiwan legend

References

External links
Interview (in Chinese) by National Open University

Paiwan people
Taiwanese male writers
Taiwanese police officers
Living people
1972 births
21st-century Taiwanese writers
People from Taitung County
Heads of schools in Taiwan
21st-century Taiwanese educators
School founders
21st-century male writers